Siamak Namazi (born September 14 or October 14, 1971) is an Iranian-American businessman. He has been detained in Evin Prison in Iran since October 13, 2015. 

On February 22, 2016, Iranian authorities arrested Baquer Namazi, the father of Siamak, when he arrived in the country to visit his son. On October 18, 2016, Baquer and Siamak Namazi were sentenced to 10 years in prison for collaborating with a foreign government. CNN reported that according to his legal team, he was the "longest-held Iranian-American imprisoned in Iran." He was released on a brief furlough on October 1, 2022.

Namazi's family is a part of the Bring Our Families Home campaign which advocates to bring home wrongful detainees and hostages. Namazi's image is featured in a 15-foot mural in Georgetown (Washington, D.C.) along with other Americans wrongfully detained abroad.

Namazi has strong friendship with NIAC's ex-presedint Trita Parsi. They published a paper together named "Iran-Americans: The bridge between two nations" which developed further to establishment of NIAC.

See also
 List of foreign nationals detained in Iran

References

1971 births
Living people
American people of Iranian descent
American people imprisoned in Iran
Iranian prisoners and detainees
Inmates of Evin Prison